Mounir Dob (born February 1, 1974) is a retired Algerian football player who played as a striker. Fodil Dob his younger brother, is also a former international football player.

Club career
Mounir Dob started his career with MC Alger Youth team, after which he went to the neighboring team CR Belouizdad where he achieved his first title Algerian Cup and scored the winning goal, then he achieved the second title, and this time the Algerian Super Cup and scored the only goal. Despite his success, he left CR Belouizdad due to some problems According to what he said. and went to CA Batna where he played four seasons and reached with them the Algerian Cup final in 1997 where defeated Against USM Alger.

Then Mounir Dob joined the giant JS Kabylie, In his first match against Étoile du Sahel in CAF Cup Dop scored his first goal with his new team. and in his first season he achieved the CAF Cup, which is his first continental title. and scored 11 goals. The following season was the best, where was the team's top scorer with 14 goals and he won the CAF Cup title for the second time in a row. as for National 1 They finished runners-up, On July 1, 2002 in the last round against USM Annaba, Mounir Dob scored the first hat-trick in its career in 5–1 victory. and in his final season played with his brother Fodil for the first time in one team since 1994, he won the CAF Cup title again and the third in a row, To end his adventure with JS Kabylie where he played 96 games and scored 30 goals.

Career statistics

Club

Honours

Club
 CR Belouizdad
 Algerian Cup (1): 1995
 Algerian Super Cup (1): 1995

 JS Kabylie
 CAF Cup (3): 2000, 2001, 2002

References

1974 births
Algerian footballers
JS Kabylie players
Footballers from Algiers
Living people
CA Batna players
RC Kouba players
MC Alger players
CR Belouizdad players
Association football forwards
WA Boufarik players
21st-century Algerian people
20th-century Algerian people